Barawal is a Tehsil in Upper Dir District, Khyber Pakhtunkhwa, Pakistan.

Upper Dir District
Tehsils of Khyber Pakhtunkhwa
Tehsils of Upper Dir District